Albert J. Hausbeck (February 15, 1918 – March 30, 1999) was an American politician who served in the New York State Assembly from 1961 to 1974.

References

1918 births
1999 deaths
Members of the New York State Assembly
New York (state) Democrats
New York (state) Republicans
20th-century American politicians